Nigella Jekyll Saunders (born 7 December 1979) is a female badminton player from Jamaica, who won two medals (gold and bronze) at the 2003 Pan American Games. Saunders played badminton at the 2004 Summer Olympics, losing to Mia Audina of the Netherlands in the round of 32. In her home country, she won more than a dozen titles at the Jamaican National Badminton Championships.

References
 sports-reference.com
 http://badmintonjamaica.org/about/national-team/adult-team/100-nigella-saunders.html

1979 births
Living people
Jamaican female badminton players
Badminton players at the 2004 Summer Olympics
Olympic badminton players of Jamaica
Badminton players at the 1995 Pan American Games
Badminton players at the 1999 Pan American Games
Badminton players at the 2003 Pan American Games
Pan American Games gold medalists for Jamaica
Pan American Games bronze medalists for Jamaica
Pan American Games medalists in badminton
Badminton players at the 1998 Commonwealth Games
Badminton players at the 2002 Commonwealth Games
Badminton players at the 2006 Commonwealth Games
Commonwealth Games competitors for Jamaica
Competitors at the 2002 Central American and Caribbean Games
Competitors at the 2006 Central American and Caribbean Games
Central American and Caribbean Games gold medalists for Jamaica
Central American and Caribbean Games medalists in badminton
Medalists at the 2003 Pan American Games